70's and 80's is the third volume of the Television's Greatest Hits series of compilation albums by TVT Records. It was recorded at Studio 900 and mastered at Bernie Grundman Studio.

The album catalog was later acquired by The Bicycle Music Company. In September 2011, Los Angeles-based Oglio Records announced they were releasing the  Television's Greatest Hits song catalog after entering into an arrangement The Bicycle Music Company. A series of 9 initial "6-packs" including some of the songs from the album had been announced for 2011.

Track listing 
Sesame Street ("Can You Tell Me How To Get To Sesame Street?")
The Muppet Show
The Alvin Show
Speed Racer ("Go, Speed Racer, Go!")
Mr. Magoo
Inspector Gadget
The Smurfs ("La La Song")
Dastardly & Muttley ("Stop The Pigeon")
Scooby-Doo
Fat Albert and the Cosby Kids ("Gonna Have A Good Time")
The Archies
Josie and the Pussycats
Dudley Do-Right
Fractured Fairy Tales
Cheers ("Where Everybody Knows Your Name")
The Bob Newhart Show ("Home To Emily")
The Greatest American Hero ("Believe It Or Not")
Welcome Back, Kotter ("Welcome Back")
Room 222
WKRP In Cincinnati
Taxi ("Angela")
Barney Miller
Three's Company ("Come And Knock On Our Door")
Happy Days
Laverne & Shirley ("Making Our Dreams Come True")
The Facts of Life
Good Times
One Day at a Time ("This Is It")
Gimme a Break!
Maude ("And Then There's Maude")
The Jeffersons ("Movin' On Up")
All In the Family ("Those Were The Days")
Sanford and Son ("The Streetbeater")
Dallas
Dynasty
Knots Landing
L.A. Law
St. Elsewhere
Marcus Welby, M.D.
M*A*S*H ("Suicide Is Painless")
The Waltons
Little House On the Prairie
Hart to Hart
Charlie's Angels
Wonder Woman
The Love Boat
American Bandstand ("Bandstand Boogie")
Solid Gold
Entertainment Tonight
Miami Vice
S.W.A.T.
Baretta ("Keep Your Eye On The Sparrow")
The Streets of San Francisco
Barnaby Jones
Starsky & Hutch ("Gotcha")
The Rookies
Kojak
The A-Team
The Name of the Game
Quincy, M.E.
Hill Street Blues
Simon & Simon
Magnum, P.I.
The Rockford Files
Saturday Night Live

Credits
Design – Beth Cumber
Engineer – Tony Battaglia
Engineer [Assistant] – David Kennedy
Executive Producer – Steven Gottlieb
Photography – Tom Russell
Producer – Bob Mintzer
Recorded By – Bernie Grundman

References

External links
Television's Greatest Hits at Oglio Records
65 More TV Themes From The 50s & 60s on Discogs

1987 compilation albums
TVT Records compilation albums
Television's Greatest Hits albums